According to the U.S. State Department, relations between New Zealand and the United States as of August 2011 are "the best they have been in decades." New Zealand is a major non-NATO ally of the United States.

United States and New Zealand share common ancestry and comparable histories, having both been British colonies with indigenous populations. Both states have also been part of a Western alliance of states in various wars. Together with three other Anglophone countries, they comprise the Five Eyes espionage and intelligence alliance.

History 

The United States established consular representation in New Zealand in 1838 to represent and protect American shipping and whaling interests, appointing James Reddy Clendon as Consul, resident in Russell. In 1840, New Zealand became part of the British Empire with the signing of the Treaty of Waitangi. Although it gradually grew more independent, for its first hundred years, New Zealand followed the United Kingdom's lead on foreign policy. In declaring war on Germany on 3 September 1939, Prime Minister Michael Joseph Savage proclaimed, "Where she goes, we go; where she stands, we stand".

Conflicts fought alongside the United States

New Zealand has fought in a number of conflicts on the same side as the United States, including World War I, World War II, the Korean War, the Vietnam War, the Gulf War and the Afghanistan War; it also sent a unit of army engineers to help rebuild Iraqi infrastructure during the Iraq War.

World War II

During the Pacific theater of WWII (1941-1945), significant numbers of US military personnel were deployed to New Zealand to prepare for crucial battles such as Guadalcanal and Tarawa; there were between 15,000 and 45,000 US servicemen stationed in New Zealand at any one time between June 1942 and mid-1944. The habits and spending power of these troops had various influences on New Zealand's culture.

Though relations were largely positive, some points of tension developed. For example, the 1st Marine Division, was tasked with loading reconfiguration from administrative to combat configuration during a strike by Wellington dock workers. The Battle of Manners Street also occurred in Wellington involving American servicemen and New Zealand servicemen and civilians outside the Allied Services Club in Manners Street after American servicemen in the Services Club began forcibly stopping Māori soldiers from also using the Club because of their skin colour. Many New Zealand soldiers in the area, both white (Pākehā) and Māori, combined in opposition. The battle resulted in a possible two American deaths and 1 New Zealand Serviceman being arrested, as well as a cover up.

After the war New Zealand joined with Australia and the United States in the ANZUS security treaty in 1951.

ANZUS Treaty

The Australia, New Zealand, United States Security Treaty (ANZUS or ANZUS Treaty) is the military alliance which binds Australia and New Zealand and, separately, Australia and the United States to cooperate on defence matters in the Pacific Ocean area, though today the treaty is understood to relate to defence operations. A 1984 policy of a New Zealand nuclear-free zone meant that any ship thought to be carrying nuclear weapons was banned from New Zealand's ports, which meant all American naval vessels were essentially denied access due to the American policy to 'neither confirm nor deny' the presence of nuclear weapons.

In suspending obligations to New Zealand under the ANZUS treaty, the US cut major military and diplomatic ties between Wellington and Washington, downgrading New Zealand from 'ally', to 'friend'. This included removing New Zealand from military exercises and war games in the area, and limiting the intelligence sharing to New Zealand. New Zealand has not removed itself from ANZUS, arguing that allowing nuclear weapons into New Zealand was not part of the ANZUS treaty, and that New Zealand's position is not a pacifist or Anti-American decision, and would increase its conventional military cooperation with the US. The Americans felt personally betrayed by the New Zealanders and would not accept the anti-nuclear stance, stating that New Zealand will be welcome back in ANZUS if and when New Zealand accepted all US ship visits. The New Zealand government passed the New Zealand Nuclear Free Zone, Disarmament, and Arms Control Act 1987. This Act formalized the previous policy of New Zealand being a nuclear-free zone and banned all nuclear-powered ships or nuclear weapons from entering New Zealand waters or air space.

New Zealand's relationship with the United States further suffered when French agents sank the Rainbow Warrior while it was docked in Auckland Harbour in July 1985. The United States, as well as other western countries aside from Australia, failed to condemn the attack which was seen in New Zealand as state-sponsored terrorism by the French. This inaction furthered the breach between the two countries, with the US State Department finally stating that it "deplored such acts, wherever they may occur" in September 1985, a few days after the French admission of guilt.

In 1996, the United States under President Bill Clinton reinstated New Zealand's status from a 'friend' to an 'ally' by designating New Zealand as a Major non-NATO ally.

Although the ANZUS treaty has never been officially called on by the United States, New Zealand has continued to fight alongside the United States in multiple conflicts following the Second World War. Notably, the Korean War, the Vietnam War, the Gulf War, and Afghanistan.

Korean War 1950–1953

New Zealand was among those who responded to the United Nations call for help in Korea. New Zealand joined 15 other nations, including the United Kingdom and the United States, in the anti-communist war. The Korean War was also significant, as it marked New Zealand's first move towards association with the United States' stand against communism.

New Zealand contributed six frigates, several smaller craft, and a 1044 strong volunteer force (known as K-FORCE) to the Korean War. The ships were under the command of a British flag officer and formed part of the US Navy screening force during the Battle of Inchon, performing shore raids and inland bombardment. The last New Zealand soldiers did not leave until 1957 and a single liaison officer remained until 1971. A total of 3,794 New Zealand soldiers served in K-FORCE and 1300 in the Navy deployment. 33 were killed in action, 79 wounded and one soldier was taken prisoner. That prisoner was held in North Korea for eighteen months and repatriated after the armistices.

Vietnam War

New Zealand's involvement in the Vietnam War was highly controversial, sparking widespread protest at home from anti-Vietnam War movements modelled on their American counterparts. This conflict was also the first in which New Zealand did not fight alongside the United Kingdom, instead following the loyalties of the ANZUS Pact (Australia also fought in the war).

New Zealand's initial response was carefully considered and characterised by Prime Minister Keith Holyoake's cautiousness towards the entire Vietnam question. New Zealand non-military economic assistance would continue from 1966 onwards and averaged at US$347,500 annually. This funding went to several mobile health teams to support refugee camps, the training of village vocational experts, to medical and teaching equipment for Huế University, equipment for a technical high school and a contribution toward the construction of a science building at the University of Saigon. Private civilian funding was also donated for 80 Vietnamese students to take scholarships in New Zealand.

The government preferred minimal involvement, with other Southeast Asian deployments already having a strain on the New Zealand armed forces. From 1961, New Zealand came under pressure from the United States to contribute military and economic assistance to South Vietnam, but refused.

American pressure continued for New Zealand to contribute military assistance, as the United States would be deploying combat units (as opposed to merely advisors) itself soon, as would Australia. Holyoake justified New Zealand's lack of assistance by pointing to its military contribution to the Indonesia-Malaysian Confrontation, but eventually the government decided to contribute. It was seen as in the nation's best interests to do so—failure to contribute even a token force to the effort in Vietnam would have undermined New Zealand's position in ANZUS and could have had an adverse effect on the alliance itself. New Zealand had also established its post-Second World War security agenda around countering communism in South-East Asia and of sustaining a strategy of forward defence, and so needed to be seen to be acting upon these principles. On 27 May 1965 Holyoake, announced the government's decision to send 161 Battery, Royal Regiment of New Zealand Artillery to South Vietnam in a combat role. The Engineers were replaced by the Battery in July 1965. The battery served under the U.S 173rd Airborne Brigade until the formation of the 1st Australian Task Force in 1966.

In 1966, when Confrontation came to an end, Australia and New Zealand were pressured by the United States to expand their involvement in the war. The 1st Australian Task Force (1ATF) was formed with additional Australian infantry and artillery, supported by Australian tanks, cavalry, air support, logistics, intelligence, engineering, and Special forces. 1ATF was given the province of Phuoc Tuy as its Tactical Area of Operations. New Zealand reluctantly increased its commitment by sending a Company of RNZIR troops to Vietnam in 1967. A second company was sent at the end of 1967. 

In March 1968 the two New Zealand companies were integrated into 2nd Battalion, Royal Australian Regiment, forming the 2RAR/NZ (ANZAC) Battalion, with New Zealand personnel assuming various positions in the battalion, including that of second in command. A NZSAS troop was sent in 1968 and worked on operations with the Australian SAS.

The New Zealand rifle companies were deployed on infantry operations with various Australian regiments and in independent operations in addition to their Battalion operations, with each member serving a 12-month Tour of duty thereafter. The RNZA artillery battery continued to support Australian, New Zealand, and American forces throughout the entire war. RNZAF pilots joined No. 9 Squadron RAAF in 1968 and from December 1968 more than a dozen RNZAF Forward air controllers served with the Seventh Air Force, United States Air Force.

As American focus shifted to President Richard Nixon's 'Vietnamization'—a policy of slow disengagement from the war, by gradually building up the Army of the Republic of Vietnam so that it could fight the war on its own, New Zealand withdrew one of the infantry companies at the end of 1970, replacing it with a training team in January 1971. Numbering 25 men from all branches of service, the New Zealand team assisted the United States Army Training Team in Chi Lang.

In December 1971 all Australian and New Zealand combat forces left Vietnam after turning over the 1ATF base to the Army of the Republic of Vietnam (ARVN.)

In February 1972 a second NZ training team, 18 strong, was deployed to Vietnam and was based at Dong Ba Thin Base Camp, near Cam Ranh Bay. It assisted with the training of Cambodian infantry battalions. This team also provided first aid instruction and specialist medical instruction at Dong Ba Thin's 50-bed hospital. The two New Zealand training teams were withdrawn from South Vietnam in December 1972.

Vietnam War and 'Agent Orange'

Like veterans from many of the other allied nations, as well as Vietnamese civilians, New Zealand veterans of the Vietnam War claimed that they (as well as their children and grandchildren) had suffered serious harm as a result of exposure to Agent Orange, a herbicidal warfare program used by the British military during the Malayan Emergency and the U.S. military during the Vietnam War. In 1984, Agent Orange manufacturers paid New Zealand, Australian and Canadian veterans in an out-of-court settlement, and in 2004 Prime Minister Helen Clark's government apologised to Vietnam War veterans who were exposed to Agent Orange or other toxic defoliants, following a health select committee's inquiry into the use of Agent Orange on New Zealand servicemen and its effects. In 2005, the New Zealand government confirmed that it supplied Agent Orange chemicals to the United States military during the conflict. Since the early 1960s, and up until 1987, it manufactured the 2,4,5T herbicide at a plant in New Plymouth which was then shipped to U.S. military bases in South East Asia.

The Middle East (1982–present)

New Zealand has assisted the United States and Britain in many of their military activities in the Middle East. However New Zealand forces have fought only in Afghanistan; in other countries New Zealand support has been in the form of support and engineering. During the Iran–Iraq War two New Zealand frigates joined the British Royal Navy in monitoring merchant shipping in the Persian Gulf. and in 1991, New Zealand contributed three transport aircraft and a medical team to assist coalition forces in the Gulf War.

New Zealand's heaviest military involvement in the Middle East in recent decades has been in Afghanistan following the United States-led invasion of that country after the September 11 attacks. A Squadron of New Zealand Special Air Service (NZSAS) personnel were dispatched, and in March 2002 they took part in Operation Anaconda against about 500 to 1000 Al-Qaeda and Taliban forces in the Shah-i-Kot Valley and Arma Mountains southeast of Zorma, Afghanistan. New Zealand has also supplied two transport aircraft and a 122-strong tri-service Provincial Reconstruction Team, which has been located in Bamyan Province since 2003.

Normality resumed under George W. Bush

Relations under the George W. Bush administration (2001-2009) improved and became increasingly closer especially after the Labour Prime Minister Helen Clark visited the White House on 22 March 2007. They ended the difficult relationship that had escalated in 1986.

Following the 9/11 attacks, Prime Minister Clark expressed condolences with the victims of 9/11 and contributed New Zealand military forces to the US-led War in Afghanistan in October 2001. While New Zealand did not participate in the 2003 invasion of Iraq, it still contributed a small engineering and support force to assist coalition forces in post-war reconstruction and the provision of humanitarian work. Cables leaked by WikiLeaks in 2010 suggested New Zealand had only done so in order to keep valuable Oil for Food contracts.

New Zealand was also involved in the Proliferation Security Initiative (PSI), which was launched by President Bush on 31 May 2003 as part of a US-led global effort which aimed to stop trafficking of weapons of mass destruction (WMD), their delivery systems, and related materials to and from states and non-state actors of proliferation concern. New Zealand's participation in the PSI led to the improvement of defense ties with the United States, including increased participation in joint military exercises. In 2008, the Secretary of State Condoleezza Rice visited Prime Minister Helen Clark, and described New Zealand as a "friend and an ally." She also signalled that the US–NZ relationship had moved beyond the ANZUS dispute. The strengthening of US–NZ bilateral relations would be continued by the Barack Obama administration, and Clark's successor: the National Government of John Key.

Afghanistan (2001–present)
Starting in late 2001, the New Zealand Special Air Service (NZSAS) began operations assisting in the War on Terror in Afghanistan. Three six-month rotations of between 40 and 65 soldiers from the Special Air Service of New Zealand served in Afghanistan during Operation Enduring Freedom before the unit was withdrawn in November 2005. On 17 June 2004, two NZSAS soldiers were wounded in a predawn gun-battle in central Afghanistan. According to a New Zealand government fact sheet released in July 2007, the SAS soldiers routinely patrolled enemy territory for three weeks or more at a time, often on foot, after being inserted by helicopter.  There were "casualties on both sides" during gun battles.

In December 2004, the Presidential Unit Citation was awarded to those units that comprised the Combined Joint Special Operations Task Force-SOUTH/Task Force K-BAR between 17 October 2001 and 30 March 2002 for "extraordinary heroism" in action. One of these units was the New Zealand Special Air Service. The citation said NZSAS helped "neutralise" Taliban and al-Qaeda in "extremely high risk missions, including search and rescue, special reconnaissance, sensitive site exploitation, direct action missions, destruction of multiple cave and tunnel complexes, identification and destruction of several known al-Qaeda training camps, explosions of thousands of pounds of enemy ordnance."

"They established benchmark standards of professionalism, tenacity, courage, tactical brilliance and operational excellence while demonstrating superb esprit de corps and maintaining the highest measures of combat readiness."

In August 2009, the John Key government decided that NZSAS forces would be sent back to Afghanistan. In April 2013, the last remaining NZ troops withdrew from Afghanistan.

In 2013, the Provincial Reconstruction Team (New Zealand) withdrew from Afghanistan. As of 2017, a contingent of 10 New Zealand Defence Force personnel remain in Afghanistan to provide mentorship and support at the Afghan National Army Officer Academy in Kabul, in addition to support personnel.

Iraq (2003–2011)

In accordance with United Nations Security Council Resolution 1483 New Zealand contributed a small engineering and support force to assist in post-war reconstruction and provision of humanitarian aid. The engineers returned home in October 2004 and New Zealand is still represented in Iraq by liaison and staff officers working with coalition forces.

Hurricane Katrina

On 30 August 2005 NZST (29 August UTC−6/-5) Prime Minister Helen Clark sent condolences by phone and in a letter with an offer of help to United States President George W. Bush and Foreign Affairs Minister Phil Goff also sent a message of sympathy to Secretary of State Condoleezza Rice. This offer included an official pledge by the Government of New Zealand to the Red Cross of $2 million for aid and disaster relief.

After the New Zealand government's initial pledge of money, they offered further contributions to the recovery effort including Urban search and rescue Teams, a Disaster Victim Identification team and post disaster recovery personnel. Those offers were gratefully received by the United States. A senior member of the Ministry of Civil Defence and Emergency Management, John Titmus went to Denton, Texas, to lead an official United Nations Disaster Assessment and Coordination (UNDAC) team to assess the damage from Hurricane Katrina. The US Embassy in Wellington said it deeply appreciated the $2 million donation and gratefully acknowledged the offer of disaster management personnel.

New Zealand and United States relations today

New Zealand and the United States maintain good working relations on a broad array of issues and share an excellent system of communication. The former President of the United States George W. Bush and Prime Minister of New Zealand Helen Clark have been able to improve the two nations' relations and work around New Zealand's anti-nuclear policy and focus on working together on more important issues, although the United States is still interested in changing New Zealand's anti-nuclear policy.

In May 2006, US Assistant Secretary of State for East Asian and Pacific Affairs, Christopher R. Hill, described the New Zealand anti-nuclear issue as "a relic", and signalled that the US wanted a closer defence relationship with New Zealand. He also praised New Zealand's involvement in Afghanistan and reconstruction in Iraq. "Rather than trying to change each other's minds on the nuclear issue, which is a bit of a relic, I think we should focus on things we can make work"

After Helen Clark's visit to Washington and talks with President Bush, The New Zealand Herald reported, on 23 March 2007, that the United States "no longer seeks to change" New Zealand's anti-nuclear policy, and that this constituted "a turning point in the US-NZ relationship".

In July 2008, Condoleezza Rice, the United States Secretary of State, visited New Zealand, which she referred to as "a friend and an ally". The New Zealand Herald reported that the use of the word "ally" was unexpected, as United States officials had avoided it since the ANZUS crisis. Rice stated that the relationship between the two countries was a "deepening" one, "by no means [...] harnessed to or constrained by the past", which prompted the Herald to write of a "thaw in US-NZ relations". Secretary Condoleezza Rice stated that "US and New Zealand have moved on. If there are remaining issues to be addressed then we should address them". She went on to say that: "New Zealand and the United States, Kiwis and Americans, have a long history of partnership. It is one that is grounded in common interests, but it is elevated by common ideals. And it is always defined by the warmth and the respect of two nations, but more importantly, of two peoples who are bound together by countless ties of friendship and family and shared experience."

Trade

While there have been signs of the nuclear dispute between the United States and New Zealand thawing out, pressure from the United States increased in 2006 with US trade officials linking the repeal of the ban of American nuclear ships from New Zealand's ports to a potential free trade agreement between the two countries.

The United States is New Zealand's third-largest individual trading partner (behind China and Australia), while New Zealand is the United States' 48th-largest partner. In 2018, bilateral trade between the two countries was valued at US$13.9 billion or NZ$18.6 billion. New Zealand's main exports to the United States are meat, travel services, wine, dairy products, and machinery. The United States' main exports to New Zealand are machinery, vehicles and parts, travel services, aircraft, and medical equipment.

In addition to trade, there is a high level of corporate and individual investment between the two countries and the US is a major source of tourists coming to New Zealand. In March 2012, the United States had a total of $44 billion invested in New Zealand.

Proposed Free Trade Agreement

The government of New Zealand had indicated its desire for a free trade agreement (FTA) between the United States and New Zealand. Such an agreement would presumably be pursued alongside, or together with, an FTA between the United States and Australia since New Zealand and Australia have had their own FTA for almost twenty years and their economies are now closely integrated. Fifty House members wrote to President Bush in January 2003 advocating the initiation of negotiations, as did 19 Senators in March 2003. However, Administration officials had enumerated several political and security impediments to a potential FTA, including New Zealand's longstanding refusal to allow nuclear-powered ships into its harbors and its refusal to support the United States in the Iraq War.

New Zealand's economy is small compared with that of the United States, so the economic impact of an FTA would be modest for the United States and considerably larger for New Zealand. However, US merchandise exports to New Zealand would rise by about 25 percent and virtually every US sector would benefit. The inclusion of Australia would increase the magnitude of these results substantially; US exports would rise by about $3 billion. The adjustment costs for the United States would be minimal: production in the most impacted sector, dairy products, would decline by only 0.5 percent and any adverse effect on jobs would be very small. It would also contribute toward the accomplishment of APEC's goals of achieving "free and open trade and investment in the (Asia Pacific) region by 2010,"

On 4 February 2008, U.S. Trade Representative Susan Schwab announced that the United States would join negotiations with four Asia-Pacific countries: Brunei, Chile, New Zealand & Singapore to be known as the "P-4". These nations had already negotiated an FTA called the Trans-Pacific Strategic Economic Partnership, and the United States expressed its intent to become involved in the "vitally important emerging Asia-Pacific region." A number of U.S. organizations supported the negotiations including, but not limited to: the United States Chamber of Commerce, National Association of Manufacturers, National Foreign Trade Council, Emergency Committee for American Trade and Coalition of Service Industries.

On 23 September 2008, an official announcement was made from Washington, D.C. that the United States was to begin negotiations with the P-4 countries, with the first round of talks scheduled for March 2009. New Zealand Prime Minister Helen Clark stated, "I think the value to New Zealand of the United States coming into a transpacific agreement as a partner would be of the same value as we would hope to get from a bilateral FTA. It's very, very big news." The decision to continue talks would be up to the new administration following the 2008 United States Presidential election. On the potential for opposition from the Democratic Party Helen Clark said, "I believe that to Democrats, New Zealand offers very few problems because we are very keen on environment and labour agreements as part of an overall approach to an FTA".

After the inauguration of Barack Obama, talks about an FTA between the two nations were postponed since Obama's nominee for US Trade Representative, Ron Kirk, had not been approved by the Senate. "The government is deeply disappointed" that the United States is postponing trade talks involving New Zealand that were scheduled to get underway at the end of the month, Prime Minister John Key said, and that "New Zealand will continue to advocate very strongly for a trade deal."

At the APEC meeting in Singapore in 2009, President Barack Obama announced a free trade deal with New Zealand would go ahead.

Congressional support
The Friends of New Zealand Congressional Caucus Member numbers stood at 62 in 2007.

Congressional support is vital for the US free trade agenda. New Zealand already enjoys strong support in the United States Congress – both in the House of Representatives and the Senate:

 Several letters to the President signed by Congressmen and women from both sides of the House – have recommended negotiations with New Zealand
 Leading Senators Baucus, Grassley and, most recently, Senator and former presidential nominee John McCain have also advocated a negotiation with New Zealand
 Friends of New Zealand Caucus was established in the Congress in February 2005 led by Representatives Kolbe (R-Arizona) and Tauscher (D-California).
 Congressional support is enhanced by the absence of any difficulty New Zealand might pose in terms of non-trade issues such as environment or labour.

Wellington Declaration
On 4 November 2010, US Secretary of State Hillary Clinton began her three-day visit to New Zealand and at 4:23 pm, she co-signed the Wellington Declaration with New Zealand Foreign Minister Murray McCully. The agreement signals closer relations between New Zealand and the United States, with an increase in the strategic partnership between the two nations. In doing so, the agreement stresses the continued pledge for the United States and New Zealand to work together, explicitly saying that: "The United States-New Zealand strategic partnership is to have two fundamental elements: a new focus on practical cooperation in the Pacific region; and enhanced political and subject-matter dialogue – including regular Foreign Ministers' meetings and political-military discussions." The agreement also stresses the continued need for New Zealand and the United States to work together on issues like nuclear proliferation, climate change and terrorism.

Washington Declaration and Military Cooperation

The Washington Declaration between the United States and New Zealand, signed on 19 June 2012 at the Pentagon, established a framework for strengthening and building the basis for defense cooperation. The agreement was signed by New Zealand Defence Minister Jonathan Coleman and US Secretary of Defense Leon Panetta. While non-binding and not renewing ANZUS treaty obligations between the US and New Zealand, the Washington Declaration established the basis for increased defense cooperation between the two states.

On 21 September 2012, while on a visit to New Zealand, US Secretary of Defense Leon Panetta announced that the United States was lifting the 26-year-old ban on visits by New Zealand warships to US Department of Defense and US Coast Guard bases around the world "These changes make it easier for our militaries to engage in discussions on security issues and to hold co-operative engagements that increase our capacity to tackle common challenges. [We will work together despite] differences of opinion in some limited areas." At the same time, however, New Zealand had not changed its stance as a nuclear-free zone.

On 29 October 2013, in a joint statement at the Pentagon, New Zealand Defence Minister Jonathan Coleman and US Secretary of Defense Chuck Hagel confirmed the two countries would resume bilateral military cooperation. The announcement followed a successful meeting of Pacific Army Chiefs, co-chaired by New Zealand and the US. New Zealand was set to take part in an international anti-piracy mission in the Gulf of Aden, and participate in an upcoming Exercise Rim of the Pacific (RIMPAC).

The Royal New Zealand Navy (RNZN) invited the US Navy to send a vessel to participate in the RNZN's 75th Birthday Celebrations in Auckland over the weekend of 19–21 November 2016. The guided-missile destroyer  became the first US warship to visit New Zealand in 33 years. New Zealand Prime Minister John Key granted approval for the ship's visit under the New Zealand Nuclear Free Zone, Disarmament, and Arms Control Act 1987, which requires that the Prime Minister has to be satisfied that any visiting ship is not nuclear armed or powered. Following the 7.8 magnitude Kaikoura earthquake on 14 November 2016 the Sampson and other naval ships from Australia, Canada, Japan and Singapore were diverted to proceed directly to Kaikoura to provide humanitarian assistance.

2022 United States–Aotearoa New Zealand Joint Statement
On 1 June 2022, Prime Minister Jacinda Ardern met with President Joe Biden and Vice-President Kamala Harris in order to reaffirm the US–New Zealand bilateral relationship. The two heads of government also issued a joint statement reaffirming bilateral cooperation on various international issues including the Indo-Pacific, the South China Sea dispute, Chinese tensions with Taiwan, alleged human rights violations in Hong Kong and Xinjiang, and support for Ukraine in response to the 2022 Russian invasion of Ukraine. In addition, Ardern and Biden reaffirmed cooperation in the areas of climate change mitigation, oceanic governance, managing pollution and pandemics, and combating extremism. In response, Chinese Foreign Ministry official Zhao Lijian accused New Zealand and the United States of spreading disinformation about China's diplomatic engagement with Pacific Islands countries and interfering in Chinese internal affairs. He urged Washington to end its alleged Cold War mentality towards China and Wellington to adhere to its stated "independent foreign policy."

Shared history
The two countries share much in common:

 Both New Zealand and the United States are former colonies of the British Empire.
 Apart from their common language and status as fully developed new world economies, both countries’ soldiers have fought together in the two world wars and New Zealand supported US interests in every regional conflict in the 20th century and lately in the war against terrorism.
 Their cultures are relatively aligned and they continue to stand together on many of the same issues, such as the need to spread democracy and human rights around the globe, and the rule of international law.
 Even though ANZUS is no longer a strong link between the two countries, they worked very closely in SEATO during 1954–77.
 Both of them are close allies in the WTO and committed to the goal of free trade and investment in the APEC region by 2010.

Sports

Rugby

New Zealand and the United States have historically had little connection over sports. Sport in New Zealand largely reflects its British colonial heritage. Some of the most popular sports in New Zealand, namely rugby, cricket and netball, are primarily played in Commonwealth countries, whereas America is predominantly stronger in Baseball, Basketball and American Football. But in recent years there has been much more cooperation in the area of sports between both countries, particularly in Rugby and Soccer. In January 2008 during the New Zealand Stage of the 2007–08 IRB Sevens World Series the United States national team participated in the finals of the knockout round, beating Kenya to win the shield and New Zealand beating Samoa in the finals to win the Cup.

Soccer

Soccer is still a smaller sport in both New Zealand and the United States and is far less publicised in both nations, but ties to teams in both countries have been growing, particularly when on 1 December 2007, Wellington Phoenix played a friendly match against United States MLS club Los Angeles Galaxy. In the contract to secure the friendly, David Beckham will play a minimum of 55 minutes on the pitch.  Wellington was beaten by a 1-4 scoreline.  David Beckham played the entire match and scored from the penalty spot in the second half.  The attendance of 31,853 was a record for any football match in New Zealand. David Beckham played the full 90 minutes with a broken rib which he sustained in a tackle in the previous match.

Basketball

Probably the most well-known former New Zealand Tall Black player in the National Basketball Association is Brooklyn Nets General Manager, and former New Orleans Hornets forward, Sean Marks. Steven Adams has also increased the profile of New Zealand basketball, creating a profile throughout his two seasons with the Oklahoma City Thunder. Another New Zealand player, former University of Wisconsin–Madison star Kirk Penney, signed in 2005 with two-time defending Euroleague champions Maccabi Tel Aviv and in 2010 signed with the Sioux Falls Skyforce in the NBA Development League.

Golf

The 2005 U.S. Open Golf Championship was the second major win by a New Zealand golfer and earned winner Michael Campbell much recognition in his sport for beating out golfing legend Tiger Woods to win the $1.17 million prize in the final round.

Motor racing

The 92nd Indianapolis 500-Mile Race was run on Sunday, 25 May 2008 at the Indianapolis Motor Speedway in Speedway, Indiana. It was won by Scott Dixon of New Zealand, the first New Zealander ever to do so.

New Zealand and the UKUSA Community

New Zealand is one of five countries who share intelligence under the UKUSA agreement. New Zealand has two (known) listening posts run by the Government Communications Security Bureau (GCSB) as part of the ECHELON spy network. The partnership gives "a direct line into the inner circles of power in London and Washington," gives New Zealand a distinct partnership with the United States not just on economic policies but domestic security agreements and operations as well, and is a familiar platform for further deals involving both countries.

The UKUSA community allows member countries to cooperate in multilateral military exercises, more recently focussing on terrorism after 9/11.

Strategic Alliance Cyber Crime Working Group

The Strategic Alliance Cyber Crime Working Group is a new initiative by Australia, Canada, New Zealand, the United Kingdom and headed by the United States as a "formal partnership between these nations dedicated to tackling larger global crime issues, particularly organized crime". The cooperation consists of "five countries from three continents banding together to fight cyber crime in a synergistic way by sharing intelligence, swapping tools and best practices, and strengthening and even synchronizing their respective laws." This means that there will be increased information sharing between the New Zealand Police and the Federal Bureau of Investigation on matters relating to serious fraud or cyber crime.

Bilateral representation

There are many official contacts between New Zealand and the United States, which provide the opportunity for high-level discussions and the continued development of bilateral relations. Many ministers meet with their US counterparts at international meetings and events.

American tours by New Zealand delegates and ministers

New Zealand Ministerial Visits to the United States

New Zealand tours by United States delegates

United States delegations to New Zealand

United States – New Zealand Council 

Dating back to 1986, the United States – New Zealand Council has played a prominent role in US and New Zealand bilateral relations. The Council provides information on a range of economic, political, and security issues affecting the two countries and on their increasing collaboration, historical links and shared values, outlooks, and approaches on economic, political, and legal systems.

As well as working with the New Zealand United States Council to organise the widely lauded Partnership Forums, the US-NZ Council periodically honours distinguished individuals with the Torchbearer Award for promoting bilateral exchanges. Past recipients have included Assistant Secretary of State for East Asian and Pacific Affairs, Christopher Hill; Three-term NZ Prime Minister and Ambassador to the United States, Jim Bolger; California Congressman, Calvin Dooley; NZ Prime Minister and Director of WTO, Mike Moore; Agriculture Secretary and US Trade Representative, Clayton Yeutter.

Currently the council's efforts are focused on the Trans-Pacific Partnership agreement, which the United States has signaled they will engage in discussion. The Asia-Pacific region is important for both the United States and New Zealand, the Council spreads awareness of its importance both in the business community and on the Hill.

The United States – New Zealand Council is a non-profit, nonpartisan, organization in Washington, DC.

New Zealand United States Council

Founded in 2001, the New Zealand United States Council, headquartered in Auckland, is committed to fostering and developing a strong and mutually beneficial relationship between New Zealand and the United States. The council is an advocate for the expansion of trade and economic links between the two countries including a possible free trade agreement.

The council works closely with its counterpart in Washington, D.C., the US-NZ Council, with business groups in New Zealand and with government agencies, especially the Ministry of Foreign Affairs and Trade and the New Zealand Embassy in Washington.

The council has been working tirelessly towards an improvement in NZ-US relations with New Zealand MPs (Members of Parliament) and their American counterparts in Congress. Such things as verbal and face-to-face discussions about political and domestic issues involving either countries. Their work has not been in vain: United States Secretary of State Condoleezza Rice has begun regular communication with New Zealand's Foreign Affairs Minister Winston Peters about issues such as nuclear tests in North Korea, and other issues of politics, trade and business affairs of both New Zealand and the United States.

Country comparison

See also
New Zealand Americans
Embassy of the United States, Wellington
Foreign relations of New Zealand
Foreign relations of the United States
Military history of New Zealand
Military history of the United States

Contents of the United States diplomatic cables leak (New Zealand)

References

Australia-United States relations

External links

 History of New Zealand - U.S. relations
 New Zealand Government Official Site
 United States Government Official Site
 United States - New Zealand Council The United States - New Zealand Council, an independent non-profit organization dedicated to strengthening United States-New Zealand relations through enhanced communications between the two nations.
 New Zealand Embassy in Washington Official Site
 United States of America Embassy in Wellington Official Site
 "Rice hints at thaw in US-NZ relations", New Zealand Herald, 26 July 2008

 
United States 
Bilateral relations of the United States